Escuintla can refer to:
 Escuintla, city in Guatemala
 Escuintla Department, department in Guatemala
 Escuintla, Chiapas, Mexico